Herbert John Maynard (12 July 1865 – 6 December 1943) was a British civil servant, active in India, who was also prominent in the Fabian Society.

Maynard was educated at the Merchant Taylors' School and St John's College, Oxford, where he won the Stanhope essay prize.  From 1883, he served with the Indian Civil Service, becoming a deputy commissioner in 1889, then councillor to the Raja of Mandi from 1890.  From 1896, he was the judicial secretary to the government of the Punjab from 1896 to 1899, then he served as commissioner of excise from 1903, commissioner of Multan from 1906, of Rawalpindi from 1911, and as financial commissioner of the Punjab from 1913.

Maynard was a supporter of the British Labour Party.  He stood unsuccessfully in King's Lynn at the 1929 United Kingdom general election, at the 1931 Stroud by-election, and in Fulham East at the 1931 United Kingdom general election.  He also served on the executive of the Fabian Society.

In 1920, Maynard was made a Knight Commander of the Order of the Indian Empire.

References

1865 births
1943 deaths
Alumni of St John's College, Oxford
Knights Commander of the Order of the Indian Empire
Labour Party (UK) parliamentary candidates
Members of the Fabian Society